Andrew John Skinner (November 25, 1885 – death date unknown) was an American Negro league pitcher between 1909 and 1911.

A native of Atchison, Kansas, Skinner played for the Kansas City Giants in 1909 and again in 1911. In 16 recorded career appearances on the mound, he posted a 7–5 record with a 3.25 ERA over 108 innings.

References

External links
Baseball statistics and player information from Baseball-Reference Black Baseball Stats and Seamheads

1885 births
Year of death missing
Place of death missing
Kansas City Giants players